Bloom is the second full-length album by British singer-songwriter Tasmin Archer, released on 25 March 1996.

Background and recording
Archer started working on a follow-up to her successful debut album Great Expectations in late 1994, after the release of the Elvis Costello covers EP Shipbuilding early in the year. While continuing to work with her songwriting partner John Hughes, Bloom marked her first album without longtime collaborator John Beck, who played and co-wrote most of her debut album and left her in the middle of 1993.

While her debut album had a plethora of producers, for Bloom Archer and Hughes settled with American producer Mitchell Froom. Recording of the album took place between December 1994 to May 1995, and was recorded at Real World Studios in England and Sunset Sound Factory in Los Angeles. Archer described the recording sessions as "a very relaxed affair"

EMI Records, however, were not supportive of the material that Archer had recorded, deeming it too uncommercial and too removed from the sound of her debut album. Archer and Hughes had to fight for almost a year with EMI executives to get the album released in the form they wanted it to be.

Release
When Bloom was finally released, EMI were still not very supportive of it and didn't push a marketing campaign as big as they had done with Archer's debut album, which damaged sales of the singles and the album itself. When released, the album went fairly unnoticed, only peaking at No. 95 in the UK Albums Chart, and the two singles released from the album—"One More Good Night with the Boys" and "Sweet Little Truth"—did not enter the UK top 40. The album was released around Europe and Japan, but EMI America refused to release the album in the United States, and therefore Archer is seen as a one-hit wonder there, with the single "Sleeping Satellite".

Archer, disillusioned with EMI, was let go of by the label in 1997, and would disappear from the music scene for several years until returning in 2006 with her third studio album.

Track listing
All tracks written by Tasmin Archer and John Hughes, except where noted.

Personnel
Tasmin Archer - vocals
Steve Donnelly - electric guitar, slide guitar
John Hughes - acoustic guitar
Bruce Thomas - bass guitar
Mitchell Froom - piano, Hammond organ, Mellotron, harmonium, Wurlitzer 
Pete Thomas - drums, percussion
with:
Electra Strings - strings on "Rain Falling" and "I Would Love To Be Right"
Caroline Lavelle - cello
Jocelyn Pook - viola
Fenella Barton, Sonia Slany - violin
Technical
Tchad Blake - recording, mixing
Martin Thompson - cover photography

Charts

References

External links 
 Bloom at Discogs

1996 albums
Tasmin Archer albums
EMI Records albums
Albums produced by Mitchell Froom